The term international system may refer to:

 In politics, international relations It is the global constellation of states. The term is commonly applied to the international systems of the Twentieth century and can equally be applied to pre industrial international state system.

 In the sciences, the International System of Units (SI)